Balearic is the collective name for the dialects of Catalan spoken in the Balearic Islands:  in Mallorca,  in Ibiza and  in Menorca.

At the last census, 746,792 people in the Balearic Islands claimed to be able to speak Catalan, though some of these may be speakers of mainland variants.

Dialects

Features
Distinctive features of Catalan in the Balearic Islands differ according to the specific variant being spoken (Mallorcan, Menorcan, or Ibizan).

Phonetic features
Vowels
 The Majorcan system has eight stressed vowels , reduced to four  in unstressed position.
 The Western Minorcan system has eight stressed vowels , reduced to three  in unstressed position.
 The Eastern Minorcan and partly the Ibizan system have seven stressed vowels  reduced to three  in unstressed position (as in Central Catalan). There are differences between the dialect spoken in Ibiza Town (eivissenc de vila) and those of the rest of the island (eivissenc pagès) and Formentera (formenterer).
 The vowel  is central  in Ibizan (as most Catalan dialects), while it is front  in Majorcan and Minorcan. The variant  is found in Felanitx.

Consonants

Notes:
 As Central Catalan  is velarized, in all instances; e.g. tela  ('fabric').
 The palatal lateral approximant  is preserved, with absence of yeísmo except for the most Castilianized speakers. Nevertheless, in most of Majorcan occurs iodització, that is, a parallel process to yeísmo ( merges with  only in Latin-derived words with intervocalic L-palatalization:  + yod (--, --), --, --, and --; e.g. palla  'straw'). Notice, this phenomenon is more restricted than yeísmo as initial L-palatalization always remains lateral in Majorcan; e.g. lluna  ('moon').
 Most Balearic variants preserve final stops in clusters; e.g.
 Assimilation of intervocalic clusters in some Majorcan and Minorcan subvarieties:
;
;
;
;
;
;
, etc.
Notice some of these assimilations may also occur in continental Catalan, such as : capmoix  'crestfallen'.
 Balearic variants of Catalan have the strongest tendency not to pronounce historical final  in any context; e.g. amor  'love', cor  'heart'.

Prosody

Morphosyntactic features
 Balearic preserves the salat definite article (derived from Latin ipse/ipsa instead of ille/illa), a feature shared only with Sardinian among extant Romance languages, but which was more common in other Catalan and Gascon areas in ancient times. However, the salat definite article is also preserved along the Costa Brava (Catalonia) and in the Valencian municipalities of Tàrbena and La Vall de Gallinera.
The personal article en/na, n''' is used before personal names.
The first person singular present indicative has a zero exponent, i.e. no visible ending. For example, what in Central Catalan would be jo parlo ('I speak') is realized as jo parl.
In verbs of the first conjugation (in -ar), the first and second person plural forms end in -am and -au respectively. For example, cantam ('we sing'), cantau ('you pl. sing').
Also in verbs of the first conjugation, the imperfect subjunctive is formed with -a-, e.g. cantàs, cantassis.
In combinations of two unstressed pronouns preceding a verb, one direct with the form el, la, etc. and the other indirect with the form me, te, etc., the direct pronoun appears first. For example, la me dóna ('s/he gives it to me'), Standard Catalan me la dóna.

Lexical features
Balearic has a large quantity of characteristic vocabulary, especially archaisms preserved by the isolation of the islands and the variety of linguistic influences which surround them. The lexicon differs considerably depending on the subdialect. For example: al·lot for standard "noi" ('boy'), moix for "gat" ('cat'), besada for "petó" ('kiss'), ca for "gos" ('dog'), doblers for "diners" ('money'), horabaixa for "tarda" ('evening') and rata-pinyada for "rat-penat" ('bat').
Minorcan has a few English loanwords dating back to the British occupation, such as grevi ('gravy'), xumaquer ('shoemaker'), boínder ('bow window'), xoc ('chalk') or ull blec ('black eye').

 Political questions 
Some in the Balearic Islands, such as the Partido Popular'' party member and former regional president, José Ramón Bauzà, argue that the dialects of Balearic Islands are actually separate languages and not dialects of Catalan. During the election of 2011, Bauzà  campaigned against having centralized or standardized standards of Catalan in public education.

See also
 Catalan language
 Catalan dialects
 Alguerese
 Central Catalan
 Northern Catalan
 Valencian

Notes

References

Bibliography
 

Catalan dialects
Balearic culture